This is a list of the equipment used by the Djiboutian Army.

Small arms

Vehicles

Artillery

Air defense

References 

Military of Djibouti
Djibouti